Ali Ahmed Karti (born 27 October 1953) is a Sudanese politician. Karti served as Foreign Minister of Sudan from 2010 to 2015.

Karti studied law at the University of Khartoum.

Karti served as a commander of the Popular Defence Forces in the 1990s. Karti is also a prominent Sudanese businessman, and previously bought the Friendship Hotel in Khartoum for $85 million.

On March 17, 2020, the Sudanese prosecutor's office ordered his arrest for his role in the 1989 coup d'état which brought Omar al-Bashir to power. It said in a statement that his assets would be frozen.

References

Living people
Foreign ministers of Sudan
Place of birth missing (living people)
University of Khartoum alumni
1953 births